The women's 20 kilometres walk event at the 2018 African Championships in Athletics was held on 5 August in Asaba, Nigeria.

Results

References

2018 African Championships in Athletics
Racewalking at the African Championships in Athletics